Nick Crofts (born 24 June 1975) is a British local politician. He is president of the Co-op Group National Members' Council, a Liverpool City Councillor and former Co-op Party National Executive Committee member. In April 2017, Crofts was named as one of the UK's 'Top-Ten Inspirational Leaders' in the NatWest LGBT Awards. In July 2019 he was re-elected for a third term as the Society's president.

In October 2019, Crofts was controversially excluded from the longlist of candidates in the Labour Party's selection process for Liverpool West Derby, a safe Labour Parliamentary seat, leading to 150 members writing to the Party's General Secretary to have him reinstated.

Co-op career 
An elected member of the Co-op since 2009, Crofts joined the North West and North Midlands Regional Board in 2011, before the capital crisis in the Co-operative Bank overtook its owner, the Co-operative Group in 2013. The crisis resulted in a governance reform process led by newly-appointed Independent Non-Executive Director, Lord Paul Myners. The initial version of the Myners Report saw "mounting opposition", resulting in his resignation from the board. A further proposal was developed, including 'Member Nominated Directors' to be elected to the Group Board. These proposals were presented to a Special General Meeting in 2014 and were approved.

The new governance arrangements provided for the establishment of a National Members' Council (NMC) and on an interim basis the former members of the seven Regional Boards comprised a transitional Council. As the NMC came out of transition, after its inaugural elections of May 2015, Crofts became a candidate for the Presidency and was subsequently elected President in July.

Crofts played a public role in the promotion of the Society's charity partnership with British Red Cross, announcing them as the winner of the 2015 colleague and member vote with CEOs Richard Pennycook and Mike Adamson. He has represented the Society at a number of international conferences and was a speaker at the International Summit of Co-operatives in Quebec in October 2016.

In April 2017, Crofts was named as one of the UK's 'Top-Ten Inspirational Leaders' in the NatWest LGBT Awards. He topped the poll in the North West constituency in elections for the NMC that followed in May 2017 and was re-elected unopposed as President in July of that year.

Co-operative Party 
Crofts was elected as a Labour and Co-operative party Councillor for the Knotty Ash ward of Liverpool City Council in 2012 and re-elected in 2016. He also served as a member of the Co-op Party National Executive Committee for four years, initially as the 'OMOV' (one member one vote) man in the UK-wide constituency and then in the North West Constituency. Crofts resigned his position on the National Executive Committee in July 2015, following his election as President of the Co-op.

Other roles 
Crofts is a trustee of both the Co-operative Heritage Trust and Merseyside Law Centre and serves as Deputy Chair of the Board of Liverpool-based social landlord Cobalt Housing.

References 

1975 births
Living people
English politicians
English LGBT politicians